The 2013–14 season is Sydney FC's ninth consecutive season in the A-League since its foundation season in 2005–2006.

Players

Squad

Transfers

Winter

In

Out

Summer

In

Out

Preseason and friendlies

Competitions

Overall

A-League

League table

Results summary

Results by round

Matches

Finals Series

League Goalscorers per Round

Awards
 Player of the Week (Round 1) – Alessandro Del Piero
 Player of the Week (Round 22) – Vedran Janjetović

End-of-season awards
On 22 April, 2014, Sydney FC hosted their annual Sky Blue Ball and presented seven awards on the night.

References

External links
 

2013–14
2013–14 A-League season by team